The 1995 Swedish Golf Tour, known as the Telia Infomedia Golf Tour for sponsorship reasons, was the 12th season of the Swedish Golf Tour, a series of professional golf tournaments held in Sweden, Denmark, Norway and Finland.

A number of the tournaments also featured on the 1995 Challenge Tour.

Schedule
The season consisted of 13 events played between May and September.

Order of Merit

References

Swedish Golf Tour